Asian Fencing Championships is the fencing zonal championship organized by the Asian Fencing Confederation for the Asia-Oceania zone. The first Asian Fencing Championships was held in 1973 in Tehran, however, fencing in the continent did not proceed actively enough. The tournament restarted in 1989 and it has been held annually since 2007. It awards points for the Fencing World Cup.

List tournaments

See also
 Fencing at the Summer Olympics
 World Fencing Championships
 other zone championships: African Fencing Championships, European Fencing Championships, Pan American Fencing Championships

References

FCA History

External links
Fencing Confederation of Asia

 
Fencing competitions
Fencing_Championships
Fencing competitions in Asia
Recurring sporting events established in 1989
1989 establishments in Asia